The 1963 John Carroll Blue Streaks football team was an American football team that represented John Carroll University in the Presidents' Athletic Conference (PAC) during the 1963 NCAA College Division football season. The team compiled a 7–0 record, won the PAC championship, and outscored opponents by a total of 140 to 28. It was the team's second consecutive undefeated season.

John Ray was the team's head coach for the fifth year. In January 1964, he resigned his position with John Carroll to join Ara Parseghian's staff at Notre Dame.

Schedule

References

John Carroll
John Carroll Blue Streaks football seasons
College football undefeated seasons
John Carroll Blue Streaks football